George Goldsmith (7 August 1850 – 5 April 1916) was an English cricketer. Goldsmith was a right-handed batsman who bowled right-arm fast. He was born at Brighton in Sussex and played first-class cricket for both Kent County Cricket Club and Sussex County Cricket Club.

Goldsmith made a single first-class appearance for Kent against Derbyshire in 1875 at Catford. He went on to play two first-class matches for Sussex, one in 1878 and one in 1879. Goldsmith later served as the secretary of Sussex County Cricket Club. He died at Hanwell in Middlesex in April 1916 aged 65.

References

External links

1850 births
1916 deaths
Sportspeople from Brighton
English cricketers
Kent cricketers
Sussex cricketers
English cricket administrators
19th-century British businesspeople